Armenian Earthquake is a bronze sculpture by Frederic Sogoyan. It expresses the gratitude at the aid provided following the 1988 Spitak earthquake.

It was dedicated on March 15, 1991.
It is located on the north lawn of the American Red Cross National Headquarters, N.W. Washington D.C.

The inscription reads:
TO THE AMERICAN
PEOPLE
FROM A GRATEFUL
ARMENIAN PEOPLE
EARTHQUAKE ASSISTANCE
DECEMBER 7, 1988

See also 
 List of public art in Washington, D.C., Ward 2

References

External links 
 https://www.flickr.com/photos/65193799@N00/294863592/

Armenian-American history
Monuments and memorials in Washington, D.C.
National Mall and Memorial Parks
Outdoor sculptures in Washington, D.C.
1990 sculptures
Bronze sculptures in Washington, D.C.
Sculptures of women in Washington, D.C.
Statues in Washington, D.C.
Foggy Bottom